Saarlouis (formerly Sarre-Libre and Saarlautern) is a town in Saarland, Germany, capital of the district of Saarlouis. In 2020, the town had a population of 34,409. Saarlouis, as the name implies, is located on the river Saar. It was built as a fortress in 1680 and was named after Louis XIV of France.

History

With the Treaties of Peace of Nijmegen in 1678/79, Lorraine fell to France. In 1680, Louis XIV of France gave orders to build a fortification (to defend the new French eastern frontier) on the banks of the river Saar which was called Sarre-Louis. Notable French military engineer, Sébastien Le Prestre de Vauban, constructed the town, which would serve as the capital of the Province de la Sarre. The plans were made by Thomas de Choisy, the town's first Gouvenour. In 1683, Louis XIV visited the fortress and granted arms. The coat of arms shows the rising sun and three Fleur-de-lis. The heraldic motto is Dissipat Atque Fovet: He (the Sun) dispels (the clouds) and heats (the earth).

In 1697, the Treaty of Ryswick made most parts of Lorraine independent again, but Saarlouis and the surrounding areas remained a French exclave. During the French Revolution, the town was renamed Sarre-Libre, but it returned to its original name in 1810. With the Treaty of Paris in 1815, Saarlouis (and the whole region later known as the Saargebiet) became Prussian.

Marshal Michel Ney, who was born in Saarlouis, was arrested and tried for treason after the failure of Napoleon I's Waterloo Campaign.  Ney's attorney tried to use the Prussian annexation to save his client's life, arguing that Ney was no longer a French citizen and therefore exempt from the court's jurisdiction.  Ney refused to cooperate, declaring himself to be French, and so was convicted and later executed.

After World War I, French troops occupied Saarlouis. The Saargebiet became a protectorate of the League of Nations for 15 years. In 1933, a considerable number of anti-Nazi Germans fled to the Saar, as it was the only part of Germany left outside the Third Reich's control. As a result, anti-Nazi groups campaigned heavily for the Saarland to remain under control of League of Nations as long as Adolf Hitler ruled Germany. However, long-held sentiments against France remained entrenched, and very few sympathized openly with France. When the 15-year-term was over, a plebiscite was held in the territory on 13 January 1935: 90.3% of those voting wished to rejoin Germany.

From 1936 till 1945, Saarlouis was named as Saarlautern (-lautern being a common ending of town and village names in Germany) in an attempt by the Nazis to Germanise the town name.

After World War II, the region (then called the Saarland), was again occupied by France. In a plebiscite in 1955, most of the people in the Saarland opted for the reunification with the Federal Republic of Germany, and on 1 January 1957, it became the 10th federal state of West Germany.

In 1980, Saarlouis celebrated its 300th anniversary.

Incorporated districts
Over time, the following districts have been incorporated into Saarlouis:
 Beaumarais (1936)
 Fraulautern (1936)
 Lisdorf (1936)
 Neuforweiler (1970)
 Picard (1936)
 Roden (1907)
 Steinrausch (1972)

Fortifications
Even today, the fortress dominates the town's hexagonal floor plan. Beside the buildings made by Vauban, there are also some constructions left from the 19th century when the Prussians got control over the town. After 1887, some parts of the fortress were slighted, but many buildings and places, e.g. the casemates, some barracks and the Great Market with the Commander's Office and the Vauban island, a former ravelin with a memorial for Michel Ney can still be seen today.

Economy and infrastructure
Saarlouis was famous for its nearby steel and iron ore production and its nearby mining facilities. Today, the Ford Motor Company's Saarlouis Body & Assembly is the town's largest employer, producing the Ford Focus. The plant in the Roederberg suburb opened in 1970, but in 2022 is threatened with closure when the Ford Focus production cycle runs out in 2025.

The industrial port in Saarlouis-Roden is Germany's 13th largest inland port. Saarlouis is also a manufacturer of chocolate.

Politics
Saarlouis is part of the Saarlouis (electoral district) in the Bundestag, represented by Peter Altmaier.

Transport
Saarlouis has a station on the Saar railway that provides hourly connections to Saarbrücken and Trier.

It is connected to Saarbrücken by the A 620 and with Luxembourg by the A 8.

Twin towns – sister cities

Saarlouis is twinned with:
 Saint-Nazaire, France (1969)
 Eisenhüttenstadt, Germany (1986; the first West and East German town twinning)
 Matiguás, Nicaragua (1986)

Notable people
Michel Ney (1769–1815), Marshal of France
Heinrich Marx (1777–1838), lawyer and father of Karl Marx
Martin de Bervanger (1795–1865), priest
Charles-Nicolas Peaucellier (1832–1913), general and inventor of the Peaucellier–Lipkin linkage
Eduard von Knorr (1840–1920), admiral of the Imperial German Navy and chief of the East Asia Squadrons
Paul Emil von Lettow-Vorbeck (1870–1964), colonial general and politician
Esther Béjarano (1924–2021), survivor of the Women's Orchestra of Auschwitz
Oskar Lafontaine (born 1943), politician (SPD, The Left)
Rainer Rupp (born 1945), spy
Gabriel Clemens (born 1983), darts player
Ralf Altmeyer (born 1966), virologist
Heiko Maas (born 1966), politician (SPD)

Gallery

See also
List of places named after people

References

External links

 
Fire Brigade of Saarlouis (Saarlouis has one of the oldest Volunteer fire departments of Germany)
History of Saarlouis 1 and Saarlouis 2 (renamed to Saarlautern) 1936–1945
History of one of the most famous companies in Saarlouis: Donnerbräu

Towns in Saarland
Saarlouis (district)
Populated places established in 1680
Vauban fortifications
Three Bishoprics